Jack Plank Tells Tales is a children's novel written by Newbery Honor recipient Natalie Babbitt.  Her first novel in 25 years, it was released by Scholastic, Inc. in 2007.

Plot
The book contains connected stories dealing with an inept and humane pirate, Jack Plank, who has trouble finding work that suits him and his inhibitions.

Reception
The book received a starred review from Booklist in April 2007, and the School Library Journal gave it a most favorable review.

References
 Publishers Weekly: "Natalie Everlasting."  URL accessed 23 April 2007.
 Booklist: Review of Jack Plank Tells Tales, 2007.

American children's novels
2007 American novels
Novels about pirates
2007 children's books